Move Your Heart is the second collaborative live extended play by American contemporary worship groups Maverick City Music and Upperroom. The EP was released on January 29, 2021, via Maverick City Music. The featured worship leaders on the EP are Brandon Lake, Eniola Abioye, Dante Bowe, Elyssa Smith, Joel Figueroa, Chandler Moore, Aaron Moses, Maryanne J. George and Chuck Butler. The EP was produced by Oscar Gamboa, Tony Brown and Jonathan Jay.

Move Your Heart debuted at No. 15 on Billboards Top Christian Albums Chart and No. 1 on Top Gospel Albums Chart. It was nominated for the Billboard Music Award for Top Gospel Album at the 2022 Billboard Music Awards.

Reception

Critical response
The Banner's Kayleigh Fongers applauded Maverick City Music and Upperroom in her review of the extended play, saying: "It’s evident that this project sprang forth from a genuine passion for music, community, and, most importantly, God."

Accolades

Commercial performance
In the United States, Move Your Heart debuted at No. 15 on Top Christian Albums and No. 1 on Top Gospel Albums charts, having earned 2,000 equivalent album units in its first week of sales.

Track listing

Charts

Weekly charts

Year-end charts

Release history

References

External links
  on PraiseCharts

2021 EPs
Maverick City Music albums